The Ellis Bird Farm consists of a grain elevator  built in 1937 and is the oldest standing "seed elevator" in Alberta. As well as a Tea House, self-guided trails, demonstration wildlife gardens, a picnic area, bird banding tours and the "World's Largest" collection of functional bluebird nestboxes.

See also

 List of museums in Alberta

References

External links

Ellis Bird Farm

Rural history museums in Canada
Agricultural museums in Alberta
Open-air museums in Canada
Grain elevators in Alberta